Moghanak-e Sofla (also Romanized as Moghānak-e Soflá and Moghānak Soflá; also known as Moghānak-e Pā‘īn) is a village in Borborud-e Sharqi Rural District, in the Central District of Aligudarz County, Lorestan Province, Iran. At the 2006 census, its population was 554, in 111 families.

References 

Towns and villages in Aligudarz County